San Miguel is a district of the Cañas canton, in the Guanacaste province of Costa Rica.

History 
San Miguel was created on 30 November 1995 by Decreto Ejecutivo 24809-G. Segregated from Cañas.

Geography 
San Miguel has an area of  km² and an elevation of  metres.

Villages
Administrative center of the district is the village of San Miguel.

Other villages in the district are Coco, Gotera, Güis, Higuerón, Higuerón Viejo and San Juan.

Demographics 

For the 2011 census, San Miguel had a population of  inhabitants.

Transportation

Road transportation 
The district is covered by the following road routes:
 National Route 1
 National Route 925
 National Route 930

References 

Districts of Guanacaste Province
Populated places in Guanacaste Province